Pseudotrypauchen multiradiatus is a species of goby native to fresh and brackish water environments along the coast of southern Asia from India to Indonesia.  This species grows to a length of  SL.  This species is the only known member of its genus.

References

Amblyopinae
Monotypic fish genera
Fish described in 1931